Shorthand Format Controls is a Unicode block containing four formatting characters for representing shorthands in Unicode.

Block 

Being invisible controls, they have no visible glyph but can have a representation.

Romanian affix -tsion-
Sloan contracted ending oo/o + ZWSP

Sloan contracted ending uh/au/aui + ZWSP

History
The following Unicode-related documents record the purpose and process of defining specific characters in the Shorthand Format Controls block:

See also 
 Duployan shorthand

References 

Unicode blocks